Edgar Lee "Ted" Darling (June 9, 1935 – December 19, 1996) was a Canadian sports announcer best known as the original "Voice of the Buffalo Sabres" ice hockey team for twenty-two seasons, calling the team's games on television from the team's inaugural season in 1970 to 1991. Prior to his work with the Sabres, he hosted Hockey Night in Canada telecasts from Montreal.

In October 1991, Darling was diagnosed with Pick's disease, an Alzheimer's-like degenerative illness, and thus, was on medical leave from October 16 to November 20. He returned to call 6 more games before being relieved of his duties by the executive producer of Sabres broadcasts, Paul Wieland, on December 12, 1991. Darling called a total of 11 games during the 1991–92 season. He was brought back, however, as a studio analyst for games on WUTV in the 1992–93 season before announcing his retirement. After a five-year battle with the illness, he died on December 19, 1996 at the age of 61.

Awards and accolades
Inducted into the Hockey Hall of Fame in 1994.
Inducted into the Greater Buffalo Sports Hall of Fame in 1995.
Inducted into the Buffalo Broadcasters Association Hall of Fame in 2002.
The press box at KeyBank Center is named the "Ted Darling Memorial Press Box" in his honor.

Memorable calls
When the Great Lakes Blizzard of 1977 hit the city of Buffalo, Darling called a game between the Sabres and Montreal Canadiens at the Montreal Forum from his apartment—phoning in his commentary while watching the action on his television.

References

1935 births
1996 deaths
Buffalo Sabres announcers
New York Giants announcers
Canadian people of British descent
Canadian sports announcers
Deaths from dementia in New York (state)
Deaths from Pick's disease
Foster Hewitt Memorial Award winners
Ice hockey people from Ontario
National Hockey League broadcasters
People from Kingston, Ontario
Canadian expatriate sportspeople in the United States